Tangenital Madness on a Pleasant Side of Hell is the fifth full-length album released by the Welsh Psychobilly band Demented Are Go.

Track listing
"Intro" 
"Brand New Corpse" 
"Mongoloid" 
"Gambling Queen" 
"Dream Space Baby" 
"Zombie Stalk" 
"Queen of Disease" 
"Where You Gonna Go" 
"Fairies at the Bottom of My Garden" 
"Aces High" 
"Thrill Killers" 
"Up from the Skies" 
"Got Good Lovin'" 
"The Chase"

Personnel
 Spark "Douche" Retard - Screaming and Ranting
 Antenormous "The Horse" - Death Beat and Keyboards
 Lightning Lex Luther - "Geetar" And Distortions
 Gray Boy "Get Off My Land" Grant - Big Bass Fiddle

Demented Are Go albums
1993 albums